Gazameda iredalei is a species of sea snail, a marine gastropod mollusk in the family Turritellidae.

Description

Distribution

References

 Finlay, H.J. (1927b) New specific names for Austral Mollusca. Transactions and Proceedings of the New Zealand Institute, 57, 488–533.
 Grove, S. 2011. The Seashells of Tasmania: A Comprehensive Guide. Taroona, Australia: Taroona Publications. [vi], 81

External links
 Kiener, L.C. (1838). Spécies général et iconographie des coquilles vivantes. Vol. 10. Famille des Turbinacées. Genre Turritelle (Turritella, Lam.), pp. 1–46, pl. 1–14 [pp. 1–46 (1844), pl. 1–3, 5, 7–14 (1843), 4, 6 (1844)]; Scalaire (Scalaria, Lam.), pp. 1–22, pl. 1–7 [all (1838)]; Cadran (Solarium,Lam.), pp. 1–12, pl. 1–4 [all (1838)]; Roulette (Rotella, Lam.), pp. 1–10, pl. 1–3 [all (1838)]; Dauphinule (Dephinula, Lam.), pp. 1–12, pl. 1–4 [pp. 1–10 (1838), 11–12 (1842); pl. 1 (1837), 2–4 (1838]; Phasianelle (Phasianella, Lam.), pp. 1–11, pl. 1–5 [pp. 1–11 (1850); pl. 1–3, 5 (1847), 4 (1848)]; Famille des Plicacées de Lamarck, et des Trochoides de Cuvier. Genre Tornatelle (Tornatella, Lamarck), pp. 3–6, pl. 1 [all (1834)]; Genre Pyramidelle (Pyramidella), Lamarck, pp. 1–8, pl. 1–2 [all (1835)]; [Famille des Myacées.] Genre Thracie (Thracia, Leach), pp. 1–7, pl. 1–2 [all (1834)]. 
 Reeve, L.A. (1849). Monograph of the genus Turritella. In: Conchologia Iconica. vol. 5, pl. 1–11 and unpaginated text. L. Reeve & Co., London.

Turritellidae
Gastropods described in 1927